Sethu Superfast Express, is a Superfast train route of the Southern Railway zone of the Indian Railways and runs between Chennai Egmore and Rameswaram via Chord line. It is a standard train consisting of 23 coaches.

Etymology

The King of Ramanathapuram Samasthanam (Princely State) in Tamil Nadu bore the title Sethupathy. So the train running through this princely territory is named as Sethu express

The other reason being it connects the peninsular sub continental India with the Island city of Rameshwaram using the Pamban bridge.

Coach Composition 

Total number of coaches: 23

See also 
Cholan Express
Pallavan Express
Pandian Express
Vaigai Express
Boatmail Express
Rockfort Express
Silambu Express
Ananthapuri Express
Pothigai Express
 Mangalore Intercity

References

External links

 Indiarailinfo

Express trains in India
Rail transport in Tamil Nadu
Transport in Chennai
Transport in Rameswaram
Named passenger trains of India